Lot 40 is a township in Kings County, Prince Edward Island, Canada.  It is part of St. Patrick's Parish. Lot 40 was awarded to Lieutenant George Burns and merchants George Spence and John Mills in the 1767 land lottery.

References

40
Geography of Kings County, Prince Edward Island